Berwyn Heights is a town in Prince George's County, Maryland, United States. Per the 2020 census, the population was 3,345. It is bordered by College Park to the west, Greenbelt to the northeast, and Riverdale Park to the south.

History
Beginning in the 1870s, the area northeast of Washington, D.C. was the scene of active and continuous development as the population of the city increased and railroad suburbs such as Berwyn Heights, originally platted as Charlton Heights, gradually grew and expanded around it.

The O'Dea House, listed on the National Register of Historic Places, is one of the homes that was erected in 1888 by the Charlton Heights Improvement Company to spur development in the new subdivision.

In 1896, it became the seventh incorporated municipality in Prince George's County. In 1967, it adopted its town seal, which contains three acorns. In 1986, it was awarded the Tree City USA title.

Historic sites
A group of the remaining original houses is located around Ruatan Street. Four of the houses were built from mail-order plans made by R. W. Shoppell's Cooperative Building Plan Association of New York City. The following is a partial list of historic sites in Berwyn Heights identified by the Maryland-National Capital Park and Planning Commission:

Geography
Berwyn Heights is located at  (38.993810, -76.912344).

Demographics

2020 census

Note: the US Census treats Hispanic/Latino as an ethnic category. This table excludes Latinos from the racial categories and assigns them to a separate category. Hispanics/Latinos can be of any race.

2010 census
At the 2010 census there were 3,123 people, 1,002 households, and 681 families in the town. The racial makeup of the town was 56.0% White, 15.1% African American, 0.8% Native American, 8.4% Asian, 0.1% Pacific Islander, 14.4% from other races, and 5.1% from two or more races. Hispanic or Latino of any race were 27.1%.

Of the 1,002 households 34.3% had children under the age of 18 living with them, 50.1% were married couples living together, 11.0% had a female householder with no husband present, 6.9% had a male householder with no wife present, and 32.0% were non-families. 20.1% of households were one person and 7.6% were one person aged 65 or older. The average household size was 3.10 and the average family size was 3.42.

The median age in the town was 34.9 years. 21.7% of residents were under the age of 18; 12.1% were between the ages of 18 and 24; 31.1% were from 25 to 44; 24.3% were from 45 to 64; and 10.8% were 65 or older. The gender makeup of the town was 52.4% male and 47.6% female.

2000 census
At the 2000 census there were 2,942 people, 1,022 households, and 713 families in the town. The racial makeup of the town was 71.79% White, 12.00% African American, 0.54% Native American, 8.57% Asian, 8.23% Hispanic or Latino, 4.38% from other races, and 2.72% from two or more races. of the population.

Of the 1,022 households 27.5% had children under the age of 18 living with them, 54.8% were married couples living together, 10.1% had a female householder with no husband present, and 30.2% were non-families. 19.3% of households were one person and 7.7% were one person aged 65 or older. The average household size was 2.86 and the average family size was 3.19.

The age distribution was 20.9% under the age of 18, 10.7% from 18 to 24, 33.1% from 25 to 44, 22.5% from 45 to 64, and 12.9% 65 or older. The median age was 36 years. For every 100 females, there were 103.9 males. For every 100 females age 18 and over, there were 100.2 males.

The median household income was $65,744 and the median family income  was $69,013. Males had a median income of $42,525 versus $34,831 for females. The per capita income for the town was $25,793. About 0.9% of families and 5.5% of the population were below the poverty line, including 0.5% of those under age 18 and 1.6% of those age 65 or over.

Education 
Berwyn Heights is served by the Prince George's County Public Schools: Berwyn Heights Elementary School, which is located in Berwyn Heights, Greenbelt Middle School (Greenbelt), and Parkdale High School (Riverdale Park).

Transportation 

The only state highway providing direct access to Berwyn Heights is Maryland Route 193 (Greenbelt Road). MD 193 connects eastward to Greenbelt and westward to College Park. Just east of the town limits, MD 193 has a junction with Maryland Route 201 (Kenilworth Avenue), which provides access to Interstate 95/Interstate 495 (the Capital Beltway), D.C. Route 295 (the Kenilworth Avenue Freeway), and U.S. Route 50 (John Hanson Highway).

Government 
The town council consists of five members, who are elected every two years on an at-large plurality voting basis, to govern the town of Berwyn Heights. The member of the council who received the most votes during the election becomes mayor. The mayor serves as the head of the government and presides at all council meetings, but in other respects is an equal member of the Council. The mayor pro tempore assumes the mayoral duties in the absence of the mayor.
 
The current mayor is Amanda Dewey. The town manager is Laura Allen.

The town has a police department, a public works department, a code enforcement department, and an administration department.

Past Mayors
1948–1952 Robert F. Burnette
1952–1954 Charles G. Durbin
1954–1956 Robert F. Burnette
1956–1958 John P. Wintermoyer
1958–1960 H. Dale Smith
1960–1962 Clinton D. Walker
1962–1966 George E. Lauterbach
1966–1968 Kenneth C. Styers
1968–1972 Harry L. Ballew
1972–1974 George E. Lauterbach
1974–1976 Jadie B. Mc Dougald, first elected mayor after change from commissioner government to mayor and council form of government.
1976–1978 Harry L. Ballew
1978–1980 Jadie B. Mc Dougald
1980–1982 Howard G. Wood
1982–1992 William T. Armistead, Jr.
1992–1998 Thomas J. Love
1998–2000 William T. Armistead, Jr.
2000–2001 Tawanna P. Gaines
2001–2002 Ronald M. Shane
2002–2003 Bradley S. Jewitt
2003–2004 Patricia D. Dennison
2004–2015 Cheye M. Calvo
2015–2016 Jodie Kulpa-Eddy
2016–2018 Cheryl Jewitt
2018 Christopher J. Rasmussen (May 9 to July 16, 2018, resigned)
2018 Lynn White (July 16, 2018 to Dec. 6, 2018, resigned)
2018–2020 Stephen Isler
2020–Present Amanda Dewey

Taxation
At 53 cents per $100 per assessed value, Berwyn Heights has one of the lower real property tax rates in Prince George's County. In 2005, the town became the first municipality in Maryland to establish a public safety taxing district, after it was authorized by the general assembly. The district imposes a special tax on businesses to fund the cost of one full-time officer and helps maintain around the clock police coverage.

County government
Prince George's County Police Department District 1 Station in Hyattsville serves Berwyn Heights.

Civic activities
The town also benefits from numerous town committees and organizations. The town, as of October 2008, has joined a State Retirement Pension, for its employees, and police officers. This was done in order to try to compete and to retain the police officers.

Sports Park, which is the home of a Berwyn Heights civic group, is located by Indian Creek.

Berwyn Heights Day is a yearly event that celebrates the founding of the town.

References

External links

 
 Town of Berwyn Heights at the Maryland State Archives
 
 Berwyn Heights Elementary School Parent-Teacher Association (PTA) records at the University of Maryland libraries. Records of an elementary school association in Berwyn Heights.

See also
 Berwyn Heights, Maryland mayor's residence drug raid

 
Towns in Prince George's County, Maryland
Towns in Maryland
Washington metropolitan area